Francis McDonald (August 22, 1891 – September 18, 1968) was an American actor whose career spanned 52 years.

Early years
Born on August 22, 1891, in Bowling Green, Kentucky, McDonald was the son of John Francis McDonald and Catherine Ashlue McDonald. He was educated at St. Xavier High School in Cincinnati, Ohio.

Stage and film
McDonald's started acting professionally in stock theater with the Forepaugh Stock Company in Cincinnati. Following eight months with it, he worked one season with a stock company in Seattle, after which he performed for three seasons with a troupe in San Diego and Honolulu. He concluded his tenure in stock theater as juvenile leading man with the American Stock Company in Spokane, Washington. 

By 1913 McDonald began to perform in the rapidly expanding film industry, initially working for Marion Leonard's Monopole Company in Hollywood. He was cast in over 280 films between 1913 and 1965, including The Temptress in 1926 with Greta Garbo. After he was designated "Hollywood's Prettiest Man," McDonald sought a tougher image by shaving his mustache and seeking roles of villains.

McDonald was one of Cecil B. DeMille's favorite character actors. DeMille gave him credited supporting roles in six of his films: The Plainsman (1936), The Buccaneer (1938), Union Pacific (1939), North West Mounted Police (1940), Samson and Delilah (1949), and The Ten Commandments (1956).

Television
McDonald performed in over two dozen television series during the 1950s and early 1960s, including in six episodes of The Roy Rogers Show, five episodes of Lone Ranger, and four episodes each of Broken Arrow, Sugarfoot, and Perry Mason. Among his four Perry Mason roles are his portrayals of Captain Noble in the episode "The Case of the Crooked Candle" (1957) and of Salty Sims in "The Case of the Petulant Partner" (1959). He also portrays "Winkler" in a 1960 episode of Bat Masterson.

Personal life and death 
McDonald married actress Mae Busch on December 12, 1915. They divorced on November 24, 1923. He died on September 18, 1968, and was buried in Valhalla Memorial Park Cemetery in North Hollywood, California.

Filmography

References

External links

 

Male actors from Kentucky
American male film actors
American male silent film actors
American male television actors
Burials at Valhalla Memorial Park Cemetery
People from Bowling Green, Kentucky
1891 births
1968 deaths
20th-century American male actors
American male stage actors
Male Western (genre) film actors
Western (genre) television actors